Sahā or more formally the Sahā world (Sanskrit: sahāloka or sahālokadhātu) in Mahāyāna Buddhism refers to the mundane world, essentially the sum of existence that is other than nirvana. 

It is the entirety of conditioned phenomena, also referred to as the trichiliocosm. 
As a term, its usage is comparable to the Earth (pṛthivī) or as the place where all beings are subject to the cycle of birth and death (saṃsāra). It is the place where both good and evil manifests and where beings must exercise patience and endurance (kṣānti). It is also described as the place where Śākyamuni Buddha teaches the Dharma.

The Sahā world is divided into three distinct realms or worlds (traidhātuka or trailokya). 

Its ruler is Mahābrahmā Sahāmpati.

Etymology
Sahā is a Sanskrit term meaning "together" or "enduring."

Chinese texts sometimes translate the term as 忍土 (pinyin: Rěntǔ), literally "land of endurance."

Composition

Realm of Desire

The desire realm (kāmadhātu) is where all sentient beings consist of a physical body and are susceptible to the experience of sense faculties. These beings are generally composed of 18 elements (dhātu), that include the sense bases and their respective modes of consciousness.

In Buddhist cosmology, the desire realm is often described as being composed of four continents (cāturdvīpaka) which surround Mount Sumeru, which itself is surrounded by oceans and mountain ranges. The four continents are
Jambudvīpa in the South
Pūrvavideha in the East
Uttarakuru in the North
Avaragodānīya in the West

Realm of Form

Realm of Non-Form

As a Pure Land
The Vimalakirti Sutra further elaborates on the nature of the Sahā world. It is treated as a pure land of its own, under the jurisdiction of Śākyamuni Buddha. It has ten features distinct from other pure lands:
The poor are attracted by charity
The transgressors are attracted by pure precepts
The angry are attracted by forbearance
The lazy are attracted by exertion
The perturbed are attracted by meditation
The foolish are attracted by wisdom
Those who experience the eight difficulties are saved by explanation of how to eliminate difficulties
Those who take pleasure in the Hinayana are saved by the teaching of the Mahayana
Those without merit may be saved by the various good roots
The liberation of sentient beings is constantly being accomplished by means of the four attractions

See also
Buddhist cosmology
Trailokya
Saṃsāra (Buddhism)
Sahā Triad

References

Buddhist cosmology
Pure lands
Mahayana
Buddhist philosophical concepts